Martin J. Robichaud (April 7, 1874 – October 7, 1958) was a Canadian politician. He served in the Legislative Assembly of New Brunswick from 1912 to 1917 as an independent member. He died in 1958.

References 

1874 births
1958 deaths